Liisa Kaarina Peltola (née Liukkonen, formerly Veijalainen; born 4 April 1951) is a Finnish orienteering competitor. She won the 1976 Individual World Orienteering Championships, and took silver medal 1978 and 1979. She is also three times Relay World Champion, as a member of the Finnish winning team 1972, 1978 and 1979 (silver 1976 and 1981).

Selected works
 (Autobiography in Finnish.)
  (Autobiography in Swedish.)

See also
 List of orienteers
 List of orienteering events

References

1951 births
Living people
Finnish orienteers
Female orienteers
Foot orienteers
World Orienteering Championships medalists
Women autobiographers
Finnish autobiographers